Áed Find (Áed the White), or Áed mac Echdach (before 736–778), was king of Dál Riata (modern western Scotland and County Antrim, Ireland). Áed was the son of Eochaid mac Echdach, a descendant of Domnall Brecc in the main line of Cenél nGabráin kings.

According to later genealogies, Áed was the great-grandfather of Kenneth MacAlpin (Cináed mac Ailpín) who is traditionally counted as the first king of Scots. This descent ran through Áed's son Eochaid mac Áeda Find and Eochaid's son Alpín mac Echdach. The evidence for the existence of Eochaid and Alpín is uncompelling.

The Annals of Ulster in 768 report "Bellum i Fortrinn iter Aedh & Cinaedh": a battle in Fortriu between Áed and Cináed. This is usually read as meaning Áed Find and the Pictish king Ciniod I, who is called "Cinadhon" in the notice of his death in 775.

Áed's death in 778 is noted by the Annals of Ulster. He appears to have been followed as king by his brother Fergus mac Echdach.

The "Laws of Áed Eochaid's son" are mentioned by the Chronicle of the Kings of Alba in the reign of Áed's supposed great-grandson Donald MacAlpin (Domnall mac Ailpín): "In his time the Gaels with their king made the rights and laws of the kingdom [that are called the laws] of Áed Eochaid's son, in Forteviot." What these laws concerned is not known.

In fiction
Áed Find is playable in Crusader Kings II (under the regnal name Áed III) in the Charlemagne DLC's 769 AD start date, and is treated as an independent duke. His son Eochaid and brother Fergus also exist in his court. Without player intervention his realm is usually quickly conquered by neighboring Pictland.

Notes

References
For primary sources, see also External links below

 Anderson, Alan Orr, Early Sources of Scottish History A.D 500–1286, volume 1. Reprinted with corrections. Paul Watkins, Stamford, 1990. 
 Bannerman, John, "The Scottish Takeover of Pictland" in Dauvit Broun & Thomas Owen Clancy (eds.) Spes Scotorum: Hope of Scots. Saint Columba, Iona and Scotland. T & T Clark, Edinburgh, 1999.  
 Broun, Dauvit, The Irish Identity of the Kingdom of the Scots. Boydell, Woodbridge, 1999. 
 Broun, Dauvit, "Pictish Kings 761–839: Integration with Dál Riata or Separate Development" in Sally M. Foster (ed.), The St Andrews Sarcophagus: A Pictish masterpiece and its international connections. Four Courts, Dublin, 1998.

External links
CELT: Corpus of Electronic Texts at University College Cork
The Corpus of Electronic Texts includes the Annals of Ulster, Tigernach, the Four Masters and Innisfallen, the Chronicon Scotorum, the Lebor Bretnach (which includes the Duan Albanach), Genealogies, and various Saints' Lives. Most are translated into English, or translations are in progress
Annals of Clonmacnoise at Cornell
The Chronicle of the Kings of Alba

8th-century births
778 deaths
Year of birth unknown
Kings of Dál Riata
8th-century Irish monarchs
8th-century Scottish monarchs